Simon Thompson is a researcher, author and an emeritus professor of the University of Kent, where he specialized in logic and computation. His research into functional programming covers verification, tool-building and testing for Erlang, Haskell and OCaml. He is the author of books on type theory, Haskell and Erlang, and runs a Mooc about Erlang for FutureLearn.

Thompson gained his D.Phil. from the University of Oxford in 1984 with a dissertation entitled  "Recursion theories on the continuous functionals". His adviser was Robin Oliver Gandy.

He has worked for IOG (IOHK) since 2019 on domain-specific languages for the Cardano blockchain platform. There, he developed a specialised smart contract language, Marlowe, designed for non-programmers working in the financial sector.

His books include: Type Theory and Functional Programming (Addison Wesley,1991); Miranda: The Craft of Functional Programming (Addison Wesley, 1995); Haskell: The Craft of Functional Programming (Addison Wesley, 2nd ed. 1999); and Erlang Programming (with Francesco Cesarini, O'Reilly, 2009).

References

British computer scientists
Academics of the University of Kent
Living people
Year of birth missing (living people)
People associated with Cardano